The Ontario Women's Hockey Association (OWHA) is the governing body of women's ice hockey in the Province of Ontario, Canada. The OWHA is a member of the Ontario Hockey Federation (OHF), the Ontario branch of Hockey Canada. The Association was formed in 1975 by Cookie Cartwright to generate interest in women's ice hockey. Roughly ten years later, Fran Rider became the association's executive director.

In 1976, Rhonda Leeman Taylor took on a volunteer position with the OWHA and helped the Association grow the number of registered female teams from 101 to 203, within three years. She became the first employee hired by Hockey Ontario to assist in the development of the OWHA, then in 1980 became its first salaried female employee.

Jurisdiction
The OWHA operates independently from the OHF's other member associations that govern the various levels of men's hockey. It governs all levels of women's hockey in the province, including minor, junior, and senior, at a provincial level.

Leagues

Senior
Golden Blades Junior Hockey League
Lower Lakes Female Hockey League (LLFHL)
Windsor Essex Women's Hockey League

Intermediate AA/Junior
Provincial Women's Hockey League (PWHL) - founded in 2004

Minor
Lower Lakes Female Hockey League (LLFHL)
Western Ontario Athletic Association

Associated Groups
Ottawa District Women's Hockey Association
Thunder Bay Women's Hockey Association
Western Ontario Athletic Association

References

External links

Ice hockey governing bodies in Ontario
Women's ice hockey governing bodies in Canada
Youth ice hockey in Canada
Women in Ontario